The 2021 8 Hours of Portimão was an endurance sports car racing event held at the Algarve International Circuit, Algarve, Portugal, on 13 June 2021. It served as the second round of the 2021 FIA World Endurance Championship, and was the first running of the event as part of the championship. The race marked the debut of the Glickenhaus Racing car called the 007 LMH. The race was originally scheduled to be the opening round of the championship, replacing a race at Sebring International Raceway in Florida due to travel issues relating to the COVID-19 pandemic. The race was later postponed from the original date of 4 April due to quarantine regulations in Portugal, meaning it would no-longer be the opening round. The race was won by the Toyota GR010 Hybrid of Sebastien Buemi, Kazuki Nakajima and Brendon Hartley.

Qualifying

Qualifying Results
Pole position winners in each class are marked in bold.

Race

Race Result
The minimum number of laps for classification (70% of the overall winning car's race distance) was 210 laps.

Standings after the race

2021 Hypercar World Endurance Drivers' Championship

2021 Hypercar World Endurance Championship

 Note: Only the top five positions are included for the Drivers Championship standings.

2021 LMP2 World Endurance Drivers' Championship

2021 LMP2 World Endurance Championship

 Note: Only the top five positions are included for the Drivers Championship standings.

2021 World Endurance GTE Drivers' Championship

2021 World Endurance GTE Manufacturers' Championship

 Note: Only the top five positions are included for the Drivers Championship standings.

References

Auto races in Portugal
Portimão
8 Hours of Portimão
8 Hours of Portimão